The following article presents a summary of the 1931 football (soccer) season in Brazil, which was the 30th season of competitive football in the country.

Campeonato Paulista

Final Standings

São Paulo da Floresta declared as the Campeonato Paulista champions.

State championship champions

Other competition champions

Brazil national team
The following table lists all the games played by the Brazil national football team in official competitions and friendly matches during 1931.

References

 Brazilian competitions at RSSSF
 1931 Brazil national team matches at RSSSF

 
Seasons in Brazilian football
Brazil